Antônio Câmara is the name of:

António Câmara, Portuguese academic
Antônio Câmara, Brazilian politician